Gowerton School is a secondary school located in Gowerton, near Swansea, Wales.

History

Intermediate School
The school opened on 5 October 1896 in Talbot Street as a co-educational Intermediate school under the Welsh Intermediate Education Act 1889. Later it became Gowerton County School administered by the local (county) authority.

Grammar school
In May 1940, the Talbot Street school became a boys' grammar school when a girls' grammar school opened on Cecil Road.

Comprehensive
The school in its present form was created in 1973 from the merger of Gowerton Girls' Grammar School and Gowerton Boys' Grammar School. The Upper School was at Cecil Road and the Middle School was on Talbot Road. In 1987 the school was centralised on the Cecil Road (former girls' school) site.

Gowerton School today serves pupils from the north and west of the Gower peninsula and from the Swansea suburbs of Gowerton, Waunarlwydd and Dunvant from age 11 to 18, with a successful sixth form specialising in A level and Welsh Baccalaureate courses.

ESTYN inspections in 1994, 2000, 2005, 2011 and 2017 have been consistently good. The 2011 inspection report under the new Welsh inspection framework noted the school's outstanding ethos, inspiring leadership, good performance and excellent prospects, with high academic expectations and achievements, excellent care for pupil welfare and sector leading use of ICT in teaching.

In July 2013, parents supported boys wearing skirts as they had not been permitted to wear school shorts or to roll their trousers up during particularly hot summer weather.

Location
The school is located off Cecil Road in Gowerton. Opposite the school's entrance on Park Road is Ysgol Gyfun Gŵyr, a Welsh speaking school that used to house the Boy's Grammar School.

School layout
The school is large compared to other secondary schools in the UK. It has three main blocks, a block consisting of demountable buildings and an additional block.
 'A' block houses the main entrance/reception, office, main hall, canteen, gymnasium and the English and modern foreign language departments.
 'B' block houses mathematics, design and technology, religious education and the STF unit. It also houses the main literacy block for those pupils with problems with literacy. It also houses the pupil support offices and houses the sixth form canteen and common room. A pair of science rooms are located in the block.
 'C' block houses the arts and humanities departments.
 'D' block houses the Welsh language department and also houses the school nurse's room. There is also a drama room, sports hall with male and female changing rooms, weights room and a Business Studies/Psychology room.
 'F' block is used for science and is the newest building, constructed in 2009.

In addition to the main blocks there are also the tennis courts, two playing fields and a redgra adjacent to F Block and C Block.

Notable former pupils and staff

Staff
 Nia Griffith: Shadow Secretary of State for Defence (2016-), Labour MP for Llanelli (2005- ). Head of Languages from 1986 to 1992.

Pupils

 Huw Irranca-Davies: Labour AM for Ogmore (2016- ). Formerly MP for the constituency of the same name (2002–16).
 Tracy Edwards MBE: yachtswoman.
 Steve Lovell (Welsh footballer)
 Andy Williams: rugby player.
 Dan Biggar: Wales International rugby player.
 Liam Williams: Wales International rugby player.

Pupils of Gowerton Grammar School

 John William Bowen: Labour MP for Crewe (1929–31). Chairman from 1949 to 1952 of London County Council (1949–52).
 Willie Davies: Rugby union & Rugby League player.
 Haydn Tanner Rugby Union player. Cousin of Willie Davies
 Onllwyn Brace: rugby player.
 Alun Talfan Davies: QC, judge and publisher.
 Ifor Davies: Labour MP for Gower (1959–82).
 Roy Evans: General Secretary of the Iron and Steel Trades Confederation (1985–93).
 Gwyn Francis: rugby player.
 Norman Gale (rugby player)
 Walter Glynne (1890-1970), operatic tenor and concert singer
 Bryan Grenfell: Population biologist.
 Clive Griffiths: rugby player.
 Rowe Harding: rugby union player. Captained Wales (1924–28). Later a barrister, judge, naturalist and philanthropist.
 Edwina Hart: Minister for Business, Enterprise, Technology and Science (2011–16), Minister for Health and Social Services (2007-11), Labour AM for Gower (1999-2016); Welsh Government minister
 Frederick Higginson: WW2 Battle of Britain Ace.
 Alun Hoddinott: composer, Professor of Music at Cardiff University (1967–87).
 Karl Jenkins: composer.
 Lewis Jones: rugby player.
 John Maddox: Editor of Nature (1966–73, 80–85).
 Alan Morgan: Bishop of Sherwood (1989–2006).
 Dennis O'Neill: tenor
 John Pook: poet.
 Gareth Roberts: rugby union player.
 Ceri Richards, artist.
 Don Shepherd, cricketer.
 Peter Stead: historian.
 John Sparkes: comedy writer.
 Haydn Tanner: international rugby union player for Wales.
 Bleddyn Taylor: rugby player.
 Gwyn Thomas (footballer)
 Rhys Derrick Chamberlain Walters: Dean of Liverpool (1983–99)
 David Williams: Professor of Mathematical Statistics at the University of Cambridge (1985–92), and Director of the university's Statistical Laboratory (1987–91).
 Byron Davies: Conservative MP for Gower (2015–17).

References

External links
 }
 ESTYN Inspection report 2011
 Department for Education listing 
 Gowertonian Society website

Secondary schools in Swansea
Educational institutions established in 1940
1940 establishments in Wales